Vannia Gava (born 30 June 1974) is an Italian politician from Lega Nord. She is currently Undersecretary at the Ministry of the Ecological Transition in the Draghi Cabinet.

References 

1974 births
Living people
Lega Nord politicians
21st-century Italian women politicians
Women government ministers of Italy
Conte I Cabinet
Draghi Cabinet
Deputies of Legislature XVIII of Italy
Women members of the Chamber of Deputies (Italy)